Barry John Keane (born 1 May 1990) is an Irish Gaelic footballer with Kerry GAA and has played with them at minor Under 21 and senior level. He is the grandson of the famous former Kerry player John Dowling. He plays with the Kerins O'Rahilly's club in Tralee. Barry John made his Championship debut for Kerry against Tipperary in 2010 at Semple Stadium.

Honours One all Ireland senior title, 2014 v Donegal.

References
 Munster U21FC: Holders dethroned - HoganStand
 O'Rahilly's reach Kerry league decider - HoganStand
 Brendan's take Munster title - HoganStand

1990 births
Living people
Donegal Boston Gaelic footballers
Kerins O'Rahilly's Gaelic footballers
Kerry inter-county Gaelic footballers
People from Tralee